Warpaint is the fifth album by American singer-songwriter Happy Rhodes, released in 1991. It is the first of Rhodes' albums to feature musicians other than herself.

Track listing
"Waking Up" – 4:06
"Feed The Fire" – 4:33
"Murder" – 4:55
"To Live In Your World" – 3:33
"Phobos" – 5:13
"Wrong Century" – 4:25
"Lay Me Down" – 3:51
"Terra Incognita" – 4:33
"All Things (Mia ia io)" – 4:48
"Words Weren't Made For Cowards" – 5:22
"Warpaint" – 6:15
"In Hiding" – 3:12

Personnel
Happy Rhodes – vocals, keyboards, percussion
Kevin Bartlett – guitars, keyboards, percussion
Bob Van Detta – bass on "Warpaint"
Mitch Elrod – additional vocals on "Wrong Century"
Martha Waterman – keyboards on "In Hiding"
Elizabeth Jones – violin on "Lay Me Down"

References

1991 albums
Happy Rhodes albums